James Smith (7 October 1800—25 February 1865) was an Anglican priest in Ireland during the 19th century. Creery was born in County Mayo and educated at Trinity College, Dublin. He was Archdeacon of Connor from 1849 until his death.

References

Alumni of Trinity College Dublin
Church of Ireland priests
19th-century Irish Anglican priests
Archdeacons of Connor
1800 births
1865 deaths
People from County Mayo